This is a list of learned societies in the United Kingdom.

Notes

References

 
Learned societies